Xavier James Edwards (born August 9, 1999) is an American professional baseball shortstop in the Miami Marlins organization.

Amateur career
Edwards graduated from North Broward Preparatory School in Coconut Creek, Florida. As a senior, he batted .406 with 16 runs batted in, 24 stolen bases, and a .532 on-base percentage for the school's baseball team. He committed to play college baseball at Vanderbilt University.

Professional career

San Diego Padres
The San Diego Padres selected Edwards with the 38th overall selection in the 2018 Major League Baseball (MLB) draft and signed for $2.6 million. He made his professional debut with the AZL Padres and was promoted to the Tri-City Dust Devils in August. In 45 total games between the two teams, Edwards slashed .346/.453/.409 with 16 RBIs and 22 stolen bases.

In 2019, he began with the Fort Wayne TinCaps, earning Midwest League All-Star honors. After slashing .336/.392/.414 with one home run, 30 RBIs, and 20 stolen bases over 77 games, he was promoted to the Lake Elsinore Storm in July. During 46 games with Lake Elsinore, he hit .301/.349/.367 with 14 stolen bases.

After the season, on October 10, 2019, he was selected for the United States national baseball team in the 2019 WBSC Premier 12.

Tampa Bay Rays
On December 6, 2019, Edwards, Hunter Renfroe, and a player to be named later (PTBNL) were traded to the Tampa Bay Rays in exchange for Tommy Pham and Jake Cronenworth. The PTBNL, Esteban Quiroz, was named in March 2020.

Edwards did not play a minor league game in 2020 due to the cancellation of the season. In 2021, he played for the Montgomery Biscuits, slashing .302/.377/.368 with 27 RBIs and 19 stolen bases over 79 games.

Miami Marlins
On November 15, 2022, Edwards was traded to the Miami Marlins along with J. T. Chargois in exchange for Marcus Johnson and Santiago Suarez. Edwards was optioned to the Triple-A Jacksonville Jumbo Shrimp to begin the 2023 season.

References

External links

1999 births
Living people
African-American baseball players
Arizona League Padres players
Baseball shortstops
Baseball players from New York (state)
Fort Wayne TinCaps players
Lake Elsinore Storm players
People from Mineola, New York
Tri-City Dust Devils players
United States national baseball team players
2019 WBSC Premier12 players
21st-century African-American sportspeople